Max Weber influenced German society and politics in the late 1910s. Some of his speeches and articles made a big impression on his listeners; such as "Science as a Vocation" and "Politics as a Vocation" delivered at the University of Munich in late 1910s. Weber was a prolific speaker and lecturer, and delivered many speeches in his roles as an academic, politician, and German nationalist.

Notable public speeches

Speech for the German National Committee (August 1916)

Chancellor von Bethmann Holweg founded the German National Committee to give the opposition to large scale annexation a voice. Right-wing groups were pushing the government to demand large conquests for Germany and a total defeat of the allies. They wanted no compromises towards the allies.

Weber became a member of this committee, which was powerless from the beginning, because the war goals were not discussable for this committee. Weber broke the rule during his first speech in Nuremberg.

He told his listeners that he was not a member of the committee. He wanted the German politics to do what is just. The war shouldn't take an hour too long, because many people are suffering in the trenches. Weber openly declared to be against the unrestrained submarine war.

Three lessons could be learned from the war. First is that money was a main reason why the war came into being. Secondly, industry and capitalists were very important for the war efforts. Thirdly, the state is more important than the nation, because the state rules over the life and death of its subjects. But when state and nation are combined, the state has more power. The poor results of Austria-Hungarian war efforts compared to Germany were an example of this.

Germany fought this war to become a major power in Central Europe. Germany should responsible for an honourable treatment of the small nations in Central Europe and to prevent political subdual. He wanted the small nations to remain mainly politically independent, but German economy should be predominant. This way Germany could have a lasting result when it wins the war.

"Science as a Vocation" (1917)

Speech in Munich (November 1917)

After hearing of the near collapse of Austria-Hungary, Weber advocated peace during a mass meeting in Munich.

'I don't speak as a scientist but as a politician. As a professor at a university, I have no special authority in politics, just like an admiral when he can't see the most important things, or a common worker.
The threat of the 'Alldeutschen' is that they usually have the strongest influence on the government. The Alldeutschen are proud that they saw this war coming for a long time. They were not the only ones, but they were among the instigators of the war. They believed that politics should be made with a big mouth. The small efforts of German politics were achieved with a lot of noise; our enemies have achieved much more without noise. The Alldeutsche politics, for example, during the Boer War prevented our coming to an agreement with England. The hate against England was mainly directed towards the English constitution. 'For god sake no alliance with England, that would only bring us parliamentarianism'. This way domestic political motives became the basis for foreign policy or other any policy.

Hand in hand with these fears of the English constitution was a worthless wooing of the Tsar's Russia, which brought us the hate of the Russian liberals and the despise of the autocratic ruler.
The domestic political motives are responsible for this foreign policy, is proven by the submarine-agitation of the Alldeutschen. It began when the electoral reform was announced. Was this coincidence? In both questions we see the same enemies of Bethmann. From the moment that the submarine war was a political and diplomatic possibility, the prophecies came. The military leaders never joined the agitation, but they accepted it. They knew that the end of the prophecies would have more effect on morale than a peace resolution could. Together with the submarine war came the Mexico telegram. Who defended Zimmermann after this capital blunder? It was always the same group!

Today they accuse the majority of the parliament of wanting a 'Hungerfrieden' (literally "hunger peace"). We should never accept a "hunger peace," but if foreign countries think that we will accept a "hunger peace," then this group is responsible for discrediting the policy of the parliament with the word "hunger peace."

The Alldeutschen want us to follow a politics of annexation without any consideration of our allies. The young emperor Charles of Austria-Hungary complained after the Russian revolution that he has nothing to say. Emperor Charles has a different opinion than Italy and Romania, who declared war on Germany, but an alliance between Austria and an Alldeutschen Germany would be very weak. The consideration of our allies was one of the most important reasons for the decision of the parliament on 19 July; today it can easily be said. The enemies of an agreement know that the parliamentary majority had to keep their motive secret; their agitation was therefore even more condemnable.

The Alldeutschen, who call themselves Fatherland-party today—even the name is an infamy—are affectionately pointing to the mood on the front. Our soldiers don't need the pacifists and the warmongers. They say: 'If politics was pragmatic instead of goddamned babble, then the war would stop when security had come for our fatherland!' They should ask the question about a peace agreement during a national referendum or a vote on the front!

The bureaucratic system that ruled us until now has now come up with the appointment of Count Hertling (the new chancellor of Germany). We'll have to find out if he is a partyman or a statesman in domestic politics. But we welcome his appointment, because he responded to the papal proposition that he is in favour of a peace agreement. We welcome him also, because the strongest party in the parliament (the conservatives) can't deny responsibility anymore. We expect from Count Hertling, that he maintain a strong backbone against an irresponsible shadow government. Bismarck often complained about the interference of the military in politics. Our military leadership is brilliant; we have the full confidence in our military, but not when it comes to political questions.

We expect that Count Hertling keep a strong connection between government and parliament, so that a failure of communication like 19 July can be prevented. When this connection between government and parliament exists, we don't need a controlling body like the Siebenerausschuss anymore, which is headed by Michaelis. We hope that Count Hertling will understand the need for democracy. This democracy will not agree to a shameful peace; our successors will not condone it. We want to conduct world politics, but only a Herrenvolk (nation of leaders) is capable of this. Not a Herrenvolk in the sense of the Alldeutschen idiocy, but just simply a nation that strongly controls its own administration. The Alldeutscher movement will only lead to a new de-politization of the nation. Like a free ripe nation, we want to enlist in the group of the Herrenvoelker of the earth.'

"Politics as a Vocation" (1919)

Wirtschaftsgeschichte

References

Weber